Below is a list of team squads at the African Basketball Championships in 2005.

Algeria 
 Soufiane Boulaya
 Ali Bouziane
 Karim Atamna
 Redouane Fergati
 Fadji Allah Harouni
 Djillali Canon
 Farouk Djellali
 Nasser Haif
 Mourad Bougheir
 Amine Beramdane
 Abdelhalim Sayah
 Tarek Oukid

Angola 
 Olimpio Cipriano
 Armando Costa
 Angelo Victoriano
 Gerson Monteiro
 Vladimir Ricardino
 Carlos Morais
 Joaquim Gomes
 Victor Muzadi
 Abdel Aziz Boukar
 Carlos Almeida
 Miguel Lutonda
 Eduardo Mingas

Central African Republic 
 Edgar Kalambani
 Regis Koundija
 Maurice Beyina
 Martial Gotagni
 Lionel Boyamako
 Guy Joseph Kodjo
 Junior Pehoua
 Lionel Pehoua
 Destin Damachoua
 Bienvenu Songondo
 Max Momboilet
 Souleymane Assrangue

Gabon 
 Robert Ndong
 Ulrich Essongue
 Bubakar Ambourouet
 Paco Boussougou
 Assoumou Marius
 Fabrice Moussonda
 Marvin Monkoe
 Fabien Bissielou
 Jason Retono
 Stéphane Lasme
 Herve Mepoui
 Irmel Jores Dongo

Côte d'Ivoire  
 Kouamé Kouadiou
 Jean-Emmanuel Le Brun
 Morlaye Bangoura
 Jean-Marcel Besse
 Eric Anderson Affi
 Guy Serge Touali
 Kouamé Hervé Kader Abo
 Aristide Yao
 Alain Behinan
 Amadou Dioum
 Hervé Mepoui
 Stéphane Konaté
 Jean Michel Ehui

Mali 
 Modibo Niakite
 Namory Diarra
 Amara Sy
 Lansana Sylla
 Ousmane Cisse
 Tahirou Sani
 Sambo Traore
 Lamine Diaware
 Nouha Diakite
 Ahamdou Keita
 Karim Ouattara
 Samake Soumalia

Morocco 
 Aymane Jaqouq
 Moustapha Khalfi
 Zouheir Bourouis
 Zakaria Masbahi
 Nabil Bakkas
 Mouak Mohamed
 Mohammed Mouak
 Mounir Bouhelal
 Tarik Bouha
 Mohammed Houari Bassim
 Yassine Bassine
 Said Boustout
 Marouane El Moutalibi

Mozambique 
 Fernando Mandlate
 Helton Mazive
 Sansao Matavele
 Silvio Letele
 Guilhaume Cabral
 Victor Tamele
 Khaimane Deus
 Custudio Muchate
 Ricardo Alipio
 Helmano Nhatitima
 Octavio Magulisso
 Sete Muianga

Nigeria 
 Kingsley Ogwudire
 Ibrahim Abe Badmus
 Chamberlain Oguci
 Ime Udoka
 Jeff Ngutar Varem
 Abdulrahman Mohammed
 Julius Nwosu
 Ekene Ibekwe
 Tunji Awojobi
 Gabe Muoneke
 Benjamin Eze
 Olumide Oyedeji

Senegal 
 Makhtar N'Diaye
 El Kabir Pene
 Alpha Traore
 Babacar Cisse
 Issa Konare
 Maleye N'Doye
 Sidy Faye
 Jules Aw
 Boniface N'Dong
 Souleymane Camara
 Souleymane Wane
 Malick Badiane

South Africa 
 Fusi Mazibuko
 Quintin Denyssen
 Nyakallo Nthuping
 Pat Engelbert
 Johan Malan
 Lindokhule Sibankulu
 Many Matando
 Craig Gilchrist
 Lesego Molebatsi
 Neo Mothiba
 Craig Ngobeni
 Chris Trauernicht

Tunisia 
 Radhouane Slimane
 Walid Bouslama
 Ali El Amri
 Oussama Ferjani
 Naim Dhifallah
 Marouan Kechrid
 Maher Khenfir
 Marouane Lahmar
 Atef Maoua
 Fouhed Stiti
 Samy Ouellani
 Mejdi Maalaoui

See also
 2005 FIBA Africa Clubs Champions Cup squads

References
 AfricaBasket

2005 squads
squads